Mission Guadalupe del Norte, also known as Misión de Nuestra Señora de Guadalupe del Norte, is a Spanish mission located in Valle de Guadalupe, Baja California. It was founded by the Dominican missionary Félix Caballero in June 1834 in an area long inhabited by the Kumeyaay people. The mission was the last of the Dominican missions to be founded, and one of only two founded after Mexico gained its independence from Spain in 1821.

Location

The mission's inland site, about 25 kilometers east of Misión San Miguel was presumably chosen for the agricultural potential of its wide valley. Wheat, olives, pears, and grapes were among the crops that were produced.

History
Mission Guadalupe del Norte may have had about 400 Kumeyaay Indians in its care. However, conflicts seem to have been frequent, both with the local groups and with Quechan from as far away as the lower Colorado River. In 1840, a rebellion under a local leader, Jatñil, forced Caballero to abandon the mission.

Construction
Stone foundations and adobe walls from the short-lived mission survived at the site as late as the middle twentieth century. Only the foundations of the original mission complex remain.

See also

 Spanish missions in Baja California
 Misión El Descanso - the penultimate Dominican mission to be founded, 1817
 Mission San Francisco Solano - the last Franciscan mission to be founded, 1824

References
 Mathes, W. Michael. 2001. "Nuestra Señora de Guadalupe: The Last Mission of the Californias and Theater of Conflicts, 1795–1840". Pacific Coast Archaeological Society Quarterly 37(4):25-29
 Meigs, Peveril, III. 1935. The Dominican Mission Frontier of Lower California. University of California Publications in Geography No. 7. Berkeley.
 Meigs, Peveril, III. 2001. "Guadalupe: Last Mission of the Californias". Pacific Coast Archaeological Society Quarterly 37(4):19-24.
 Vernon, Edward W. 2002. Las Misiones Antiguas: The Spanish Missions of Baja California, 1683–1855. Viejo Press, Santa Barbara, California.

Nuestra Senora de Guadalupe
Landmarks in Ensenada
1834 establishments in Mexico